"Before I Let Go" is a song performed by American R&B band Maze, issued as the second single from the band's fifth album and first live album Live in New Orleans. Although Live in New Orleans is a live album, "Before I Let Go" appears on the album as a studio recording. Written and produced by lead singer Frankie Beverly, the song peaked at #13 on the Billboard R&B chart in 1981.

Beyoncé covered the song for her 2019 film Homecoming, and it's the focus of a 2021 episode of Jenna Wortham and Wesley Morris's New York Times podcast, Still Processing.

Chart positions

Beyoncé version

Beyoncé covered the song for her 2019 film Homecoming, and included the cover on the accompanying live album. It also includes a sample of New Orleans bounce artist, DJ Jubilee, one of the pioneers of bounce music, recorded on Take Fo' Records. An interpolation of "Candy" by Cameo also runs throughout the song.

Beverly told Billboard that the cover was "one of the high points of (his) life... in a class of its own" and made him "feel bigger than ever! I feel like I have a huge smash out there."

Chart positions

Weekly charts

Year-end charts

Certifications

References

External links
 
 

1981 singles
Capitol Records singles
Maze (band) songs
Song recordings produced by Frankie Beverly
Songs written by Frankie Beverly
1981 songs